Joshua Thomas Radnor (born July 29, 1974) is an American actor, filmmaker, author, and musician. He is best known for portraying Ted Mosby on the popular and Emmy Award–winning CBS sitcom How I Met Your Mother. He made his writing and directorial debut with the 2010 comedy drama film Happythankyoumoreplease, for which he won the Sundance Film Festival Audience Award and was nominated for the Grand Jury Prize.

In 2012, he wrote, directed and starred in his second film, Liberal Arts, which premiered at the 2012 Sundance Film Festival. In 2014, Radnor portrayed Isaac in the Broadway play Disgraced, which was nominated for the Tony Award for Best Play. He then starred as Dr. Jedediah Foster on the PBS American Civil War drama series Mercy Street, Lou Mazzuchelli in the musical series Rise, and as Lonny Flash in Hunters.

Early life and education
Radnor was born in Columbus, Ohio to a Jewish family, the son of Carol Radnor (née Hirsch), a high school guidance counselor, and Alan Radnor, a medical malpractice lawyer. Radnor has two sisters, Melanie Radnor Silverman and Joanna Radnor Vilensky.

He grew up in Bexley, Ohio, a suburb of Columbus, and was raised in Conservative Judaism. He attended the Orthodox Jewish day school Columbus Torah Academy before going to Bexley High School and then Kenyon College, where his school's theater department presented him with the Paul Newman Award and during which he spent a semester (Spring 1995) training at the National Theater Institute at the Eugene O'Neill Theater Center in Waterford, Connecticut. He graduated from Kenyon with a Bachelor of Arts in drama in 1996. Radnor received his Master of Fine Arts degree in acting from New York University's graduate acting program at the Tisch School of the Arts in 1999. Radnor participated in an Israel experience program in Tzfat with Livnot U'Lehibanot in 1997.

Career

Radnor was cast as the lead in The WB series Off Centre. However, the role was re-cast with Eddie Kaye Thomas before the first episode aired. In 2002, he made his Broadway debut in the stage version of The Graduate, succeeding Jason Biggs, opposite Kathleen Turner and Alicia Silverstone. In 2004, Radnor starred in The Paris Letter alongside his future How I Met Your Mother co-star Neil Patrick Harris. From 2005 to 2014, Radnor starred in How I Met Your Mother, his biggest role to date.

In July 2008, he starred opposite Jennifer Westfeldt in the premiere of the play Finks, written by Joe Gilford and directed by Charlie Stratton for New York Stage and Film. Radnor made his directorial debut with the film Happythankyoumoreplease, where he was both the writer and star of the 2010 comedy-drama.
His second directorial effort, Liberal Arts, starring himself and Elizabeth Olsen, premiered at the Sundance Film Festival on January 22, 2012. Radnor appeared in the Broadway production of Disgraced, which opened October 23, 2014, at the Lyceum Theatre. He is set to direct the sci-fi thriller film The Leaves. Radnor is currently starring in the Amazon Prime series, Hunters, as Lonny Flash, and on Netflix's Centaurworld, as Durpleton.

In October 2016, Radnor also confirmed he is in a band, Radnor and Lee, with Australian musician Ben Lee. Radnor and Lee had known each other for "twelve or thirteen years after meeting on the set of How I Met Your Mother" eventually writing songs together. Their debut album, Radnor & Lee was released on November 10, 2017, "receiving widespread praise across the board, and cementing the duo as an accomplished pair of artists," stated Rolling Stone. On February 19, 2020, Spin announced Radnor and Lee's sophomore album, Golden State, out on Flower Moon Records, and premiered the first single "Outside In." American Songwriter later premiered the video for the album's 2nd single, "Simple Harmony." Due to the COVID-19 pandemic, the album's release date was pushed back to June 2020.

Radnor's debut solo EP, One More Then I'll Let You Go, was released on April 16, 2021, on Flower Moon Records. Rolling Stone premiered the first single, "The High Road,"  March 10, 2021, calling it a "gently lilting ballad about the breakdown of a friendship on which he sings... which features deep textures of piano, acoustic guitar, organ, and snapping fingers." The EP's 2nd single, "You Feel New," premiered on March 31, 2021, with features in Rolling Stone, NPR, American Songwriter and Paste Magazine.

Personal life
In 2008, Radnor told the Los Angeles Times, "I do Transcendental Meditation, and part of the reason I chose my house is that I thought it would be a great place to meditate."

Radnor is an avid Cloud Cult fan. He collaborated with the band to make the film The Seeker in 2016. Radnor explained, "What's true for me about a lot of music, but especially true for Cloud Cult's music, is that it stirs up the thing that's already in you and calls it out. If this film is able to do that, I'll sleep well at night."

Filmography

Film

Television

Music videos

Stage

Awards and nominations

Discography

Radnor and Lee
 Radnor and Lee (2017, Gold Village Entertainment)
 Golden State (2020, Flower Moon Records)

Solo
 One More Then I'll Let You Go (2021, Flower Moon Records)

Additional appearances
 Paty Cantú & Josh Radnor – "Mirame" (2020, Universal Music Mexico)

References

External links

Josh Radnor Bio at CBS – How I Met Your Mother

1974 births
Living people
Male actors from Ohio
American male film actors
American male stage actors
American male television actors
American male voice actors
Bexley High School alumni
Jewish American male actors
Kenyon College alumni
Tisch School of the Arts alumni
Male actors from Columbus, Ohio
People from Bexley, Ohio
American male comedians
21st-century American comedians
Jewish American comedians
20th-century American male actors
21st-century American male actors
Radnor and Lee members
People from Greater Columbus, Ohio
Jewish American male comedians